Canadian singer-songwriter Alessia Cara has released three studio albums, one live album, four extended plays, eighteen singles, eight promotional singles and eighteen music videos. She is signed to EP Entertainment and Def Jam Recordings. Cara released her debut single, "Here", in April 2015. The song became a sleeper hit, reaching the top five in the United States and the top 20 in Canada. She released her debut studio album, Know-It-All, on November 13, 2015. In 2016, Cara found greater success in the release of her third single, "Scars to Your Beautiful". The single reached the top ten on the Billboard Hot 100 and topped the US pop radio charts. In November 2016, she released a single named "How Far I'll Go" for Disney animated film Moana. In 2017, Cara collaborated with producer Zedd to create the single "Stay", which reached number 7 on the Billboard Hot 100. She also collaborated with rapper Logic to feature in his single , which reached number 3 on the Billboard Hot 100. The lead single from Cara's second studio album, The Pains of Growing, called "Growing Pains" was released on June 15, 2018, and charted at number 65 on the Billboard Hot 100. "Trust My Lonely" and "Out of Love" were released as the second and third singles from the album respectively. The Pains of Growing was released on November 30, 2018, followed by a third studio album, In the Meantime in September 2021.

Albums

Studio albums

Compilation albums

Live albums

Extended plays

Compilation extended plays

Singles

As lead artist

As featured artist

Promotional singles

Other charted and certified songs

Guest appearances

Music videos

Notes

References

Discography
Discographies of Canadian artists
Pop music discographies